Danny Matthew Cornelius Calegari  is a mathematician who is currently a professor of mathematics at the University of Chicago. His research interests include geometry, dynamical systems, low-dimensional topology, and geometric group theory.

Education and career
In 1994, Calegari received a B.A. in Mathematics from the University of Melbourne with honors. He received his Ph.D. in 2000 from the University of California, Berkeley under the joint supervision of Andrew Casson and William Thurston; his dissertation concerned foliations of three-dimensional manifolds.

From 2000–2002 he was Benjamin Peirce Assistant Professor at Harvard University, after which he joined the California Institute of Technology faculty; he became Merkin Professor in 2007. He was a University Professor of Pure Mathematics at the University of Cambridge in 2011–2012, and has been a Professor of Mathematics at the University of Chicago since 2012. 

Calegari is also an author of short fiction, published in Quadrant, Southerly, and Overland. His story A Green Light was a winner of a 1992 The Age Short Story Award.

Awards
Calegari was one of the recipients of the 2009 Clay Research Award for his solution to the Marden Tameness Conjecture and the Ahlfors Measure Conjecture. In 2011 he was awarded a Royal Society Wolfson Research Merit Award, and in 2012, he became a Fellow of the American Mathematical Society. In 2012 he delivered the Namboodiri Lectures at the University of Chicago, and in 2013 he delivered the Blumenthal Lectures at Tel Aviv University.

Selected works

Personal life
Mathematician Frank Calegari is Danny Calegari's brother.

References

External links

Living people
20th-century American mathematicians
Topologists
University of Melbourne alumni
University of California, Berkeley alumni
California Institute of Technology faculty
Institute for Advanced Study visiting scholars
Harvard University faculty
Clay Research Award recipients
Fellows of the American Mathematical Society
1972 births
21st-century American mathematicians
20th-century Australian mathematicians